Duodonasto  or Duadonastau (Dywwædonastæu) is a settlement in the Dzau district/Java Municipality in South Ossetia/Shida Kartli, Georgia.

See also
 Dzau district

References 

Populated places in Dzau District